Hill House, also known as Cool Spring, is a historic home located on York Road at Parkton, Baltimore County, Maryland, United States. It is a large, -story brick mansard-roofed dwelling constructed about 1879. It features a four-paneled central entrance door flanked by round-arched sidelights and surmounted by a rectangular transom. The house presents a rural interpretation of the Second Empire style.

Hill House was listed on the National Register of Historic Places in 1986.

References

External links
, including photo from 1981, at Maryland Historical Trust

Houses on the National Register of Historic Places in Maryland
Houses in Baltimore County, Maryland
Second Empire architecture in Maryland
Houses completed in 1879
National Register of Historic Places in Baltimore County, Maryland